Chuck Willenborg (born August 6, 1964) is an American former professional tennis player.

Willenborg, younger brother of tennis player Blaine, grew up in Miami Shores. He won an NCAA team championship with the UCLA Bruins in 1984 and played his final two collegiate seasons at the University of Miami. In 1985 he turned professional and qualified for that year's Lipton Championships, losing in the first round to Shahar Perkiss. He was the interim men's head coach at Pepperdine University in 1997, after the resignation of Glenn Bassett.

References

External links
 
 

1964 births
Living people
American male tennis players
UCLA Bruins men's tennis players
Miami Hurricanes men's tennis players
Pepperdine Waves men's tennis coaches
American tennis coaches
Tennis players from Miami
People from Miami Shores, Florida